Tussock grasslands form expansive and distinctive landscapes in the South Island and, to a lesser extent, in the Central Plateau region of the North Island of New Zealand. Most of the plants referred to as tussocks are in the genera Chionochloa, Festuca, and Poa, also Carex.

What would be termed "herbfields" for European mountains, and bunchgrass meadows in North America, are referred to as tussock herbfields in New Zealand due to a dominance of this type of plant. Species of the genus Chionochloa dominate in these areas. They grow slowly and some specimens are estimated to be several centuries old.

See also
Canterbury–Otago tussock grasslands
Southland montane grasslands
Environment of New Zealand

References

External links
 Grasslands, Te Ara – the Encyclopedia of New Zealand
 NZ Grass Key – key to the grasses of New Zealand — Allan Herbarium, Christchurch, New Zealand.

Ecoregions of New Zealand
Temperate grasslands, savannas, and shrublands

 
Vegetation of New Zealand
Bunchgrasses of Australasia